Alexandrovka is a rural locality (a village) in Alginsky Selsoviet, Davlekanovsky District, Bashkortostan, Russia. The population was 233 as of 2010. There are 6 streets.

Geography 
Alexandrovka is located 22 km northwest of Davlekanovo (the district's administrative centre) by road. Romanovka is the nearest rural locality.

References 

Rural localities in Davlekanovsky District